This article lists the different episodes of TV Funhouse.

SNL's TV Funhouse episodes

Comedy Central's TV Funhouse episodes

Specials

Saturday Night Live sketches
Saturday Night Live in the 1990s
Saturday Night Live in the 2000s